"Bloomin'!" is the third single released by Tomoko Kawase under the name Tommy February6, and the last single released for the Tommy February6 album. It peaked at number 10 on the Oricon singles chart.

Track listing

Music video
The Bloomin'! video is largely based on Alice in Wonderland and features Tommy dressed in the signature blue dress following a white rabbit into the worm-hole. The video also features cheerleaders similar to those in the videos for the previous two singles: "Everyday at the Bus Stop" and "Kiss One More Time".

References

External links 
 Tommy february6 Official Site

2002 singles
2002 songs
Tomoko Kawase songs
Defstar Records singles
Songs written by Tomoko Kawase
Songs written by Shunsaku Okuda